Glencarlyn is a residential neighborhood in Arlington County, Virginia.

Originally created as a summer community for Washingtonians who wished to escape the heat of the city, Glencarlyn was founded by partners Samuel S. Burdett, a former Missouri congressman, and his partner George W. Curtis in 1888.

Boundaries

Glencarlyn is bounded by Arlington Boulevard (Highway 50) on the north, Carlin Springs Road on the west, 5th Street South on the south, and Glencarlyn Park on the east.

Glencarlyn landmarks

 Glencarlyn Historic District, listed on the National Register of Historic Places in 2008.
 The Ball-Sellers House, 5620 Third Street South
 Carlin Family Cemetery, 300 South Kensington Street
 Carlin Hall, a school and community center built in 1892, 5711 Fourth Street South 
 Glencarlyn Library, 300 South Kensington Street
 St. John's Episcopal Church, 415 South Lexington Street
 The General Samuel S. Burdett House, 5627 Third Street South
 Long Branch Nature Center, 625 S. Carlin Springs Road
 Kenmore Middle School
 Carlin Springs Elementary School

Historic Events in Glencarlyn
 On November 22, 1922, The Audubon Society of Glencarlyn met at Curtis Hall (now known as the Glencarlyn Community Center).  The society chapter met to advocate for protective legislation for birds in Virginia. Source: Arlington Historical Society

Notable Glencarlynites
 Carolyn Bartlett Gast, scientific illustrator
 Marion T. Anderson
 Samuel S. Burdett

References

External links
Glencarlyn Home Page
Glencarlyn Neighborhood Conservation Plan, 1978
WalkArlington: George Washington's Forest

Neighborhoods in Arlington County, Virginia
Geography of Alexandria, Virginia
Washington metropolitan area
Colonial Revival architecture in Virginia